À Distance is the fifth album by Canadian singer Marie-Chantal Toupin. It was released on September 30, 2008.

Track listing
Source: iTunes

References

2008 albums